Dmitry Aleksandrovich Beshenets (born 25 April 1984) is a Russian martial artist who represents his native country Russia in sport jujitsu (JJIF).

Career 
As a child he began with sambo and judo in Voronezh under the coach Ivan Dolbilin. He switched for sport jujitsu with his coach after 2004 when it became supported sport in Russia. He is member of Russian national team since 2008 and since that he was affiliated with city Saint Petersburg. In 2014 he was banned by national federation for 1 year for signing with Moscow Oblast without permission.

In international level he is one of the most successful jutsuka. He is five times individual world champion – 2010, 2011, 2012, 2017, 2018 and six times European champion in discipline fighting system, 69 kg weight category.

Results

Links

References

1984 births
Living people
Russian martial artists
Sportspeople from Saint Petersburg
World Games silver medalists
Competitors at the 2013 World Games
21st-century Russian people